The Rhode Island Heritage Hall of Fame was established in the State of Rhode Island in 1965. Its mission statement states that the Rhode Island Heritage Hall of Fame "exists to honor and recognize, and to extol and publicize the achievements of those Rhode Island men and women who have, in the words of the Hall of Fame induction citation, 'made significant contributions to their community, state, and/or nation.' It is also our mission to tell the story of Rhode Island History via interactive technology using the biographies of our inductees, noting their collective impact upon every phase of Rhode Island's development.  Eligible membership may include those who are native born, those whose reputations have been made while residents of the state, and those who have adopted Rhode Island as their permanent home.

Presidents, Officers, and Board

The Rhode Island Heritage Hall of Fame is managed by a president, vice president, recording secretary, corresponding secretary, and treasurer, with an active board of about twenty members, who serve as the electors to the Rhode Island Heritage Hall of Fame. They receive formal, written nominations from the general public at the Rhode Island Heritage Hall of Fame, 1445 Wampanoag Trail, Unit 201, East Providence RI 02915.

Presidents
 Frank B. Lanning 1965-1976
 Alexander DiMartino 1976-1978
 Americo A. Savastano 1978-1986
 Mary P. Brennan 1986-1990
 Blanch R. Murray 1990-1991
 Manuel Gorriaran Jr. 1991-2001
 Walter McLaughlin 2001-2002
 Paula Iacono 2002-2003
 Patrick T. Conley, 2003-

Inductees
Nearly 800 men and women have been inducted into the Rhode Island Hall of Fame, representing all walks of life and areas of achievement, including Native Americans from the earliest days of the English Colony of Rhode Island and Providence Plantations.

 Rhode Island Heritage Hall of Fame Women Inductees

Publications
 Patrick T. Conley and Manuel Gorriaran, Eminent Rhode Islanders: Biographical Profiles of the Inductees to the Rhode Island Heritage Hall of Fame, 1965-2000 (Providence: [The Rhode Island Heritage Hall of Fame in conjunction with the Rhode Island Publications Society, 2001]).
 Patrick T. Conley, Rhode Island's Founders: From Settlement to Statehood. (Charleston, SC: The History Press, 2010) 
 Patrick T. Conley, The Makers of Modern Rhode Island [1790-1860]. (Charleston, SC: The History Press, 2012) 
 Patrick T. Conley, The Leaders of Rhode Island's Golden Age [1861-1900].  (The History Press, 2019)

References

External links
  R.I.Hall of Fame website

Halls of fame in Rhode Island
State halls of fame in the United States
Organizations established in 1965
1965 establishments in Rhode Island